'The National Fire Service Academy (NFSA) is a fire service education facility operated by National Fire Agency. It was founded on May 16, 1995 and is located at 90, Yeondanjiji-gil, Sagok-myeon, Gongju-si, Chungcheongnam-do.

Purpose 
 The training of firefighters, firefighter candidates, medical officers and social service personnel working in the fire department.
 Fire safety training for the public, including firefighting safety experience training for students, medical firefighters, and volunteers.
 The study of firefighting policy and the research, development and dissemination of fire safety technology.
 Scientific investigation, research, analysis and evaluation of the causes of fires and dangerous chemicals.

History 
 July 27, 1978: established as the part of Ministry of Interior.
 September 4, 1978: Opening of the firefighting school (184, Gwang-dong, Suwon-si).
 May 16, 1995: Reorganized into NFSA. 
 February 28, 1998: Changed to belong to the Ministry of Government Administration and Home Affairs. 
 June 1, 2004: Changed to belong to the National Emergency Management Agency. 
 November 19, 2014: Changed to belong to Ministry of Public Safety and Security. 
 July 26, 2017: Changed to belong to the National Fire Agency.
 July 1, 2019: Moved to Yujin-dong, Dongnam-gu, Cheonan-si.

Organization 

 Education Support Division
 Human Resource Development Division
 Education and Training Division
 Recruiting Team

See also 

 Fire services in South Korea

References

External links

 

Government agencies of South Korea
1978 establishments in South Korea
Fire and rescue in South Korea